Kurmanaybash (Qormanaybaş) is a rural locality (a selo) in Miyakinsky Selsoviet, Miyakinsky District, Bashkortostan, Russia. The population was 194 as of 2010. There are 2 streets.

Geography 
Kurmanaybash is located 10 km south of Kirgiz-Miyaki (the district's administrative centre) by road. Kryknarat is the nearest rural locality.

References 

Rural localities in Miyakinsky District